Republican Football Federation of Crimea (RFFK) is a football governing body in the region of Crimea.

History
Until 1954, the Crimean championship was part of the Russian football community. There were also republican as well as oblast champions.

Between 1954 and 1991 the regional Crimean champions were members of the Football Federation of Ukraine. In 1992-2014 Crimea as part of Ukraine conducted republican competitions. Since 2014 the legal status of Crimea is disputed between Ukraine and Russia.

In December 2016, the first Crimean national football team was presented. Officials of the ConIFA were present during this presentation. This organization's Vice-President Kristof Wenczel said that ConIFA wanted to hold the next ConIFA World Football Cup in Crimea. Despite this announcement, the 2018 ConIFA World Football Cup was situated in London.

Champions

Russian SFSR

1939    FC Dynamo Simferopol
1940    FC Dynamo Simferopol (2)
1941-44 World War II (Eastern Front)
1945    ODO Simferopol
1946    ODO Simferopol (2)
1947    FC Dynamo Simferopol (3)
1948    FC Molot Yevpatoriya
1949    FC Metallurg Kerch
1950    FC Metallurg Kerch (2)
1951    FC Molot Yevpatoriya (2)
1952    ODO Simferopol (3)
1953    FC Strela Yevpatoriya

Ukrainian SSR and Ukraine

1954    FC Metallurg Kerch (3)
1955    FC Molot Yevpatoriya (3)
1956    FC Metallurg Kerch (4)
1957    FC Burevisnyk Simferopol
1958    MBO Simferopol
1959    FC Spartak Simferopol
1960    FC Metallurg Kerch (5)
1961    FC Avanhard Kerch
1962    FC Metallurg Kerch (6)
1963    FC Avanhard Sevastopol
1964    FC Metalist Sevastopol
1965    FC Avanhard Kerch (2)
1966    FC Metalist Sevastopol (2)
1967    FC Molot Yevpatoriya (4)
1968    FC Avanhard Simferopol
1969    FC Koktebel Shchebetivka
1970    FC Koktebel Shchebetivka (2)
1971    FC Avanhard Simferopol (2)
1972    FC Avanhard Simferopol (3)
1973    FC Avanhard Simferopol (4)
1974    FC Avanhard Simferopol (5)
1975    FC Tytan Armyansk
1976    FC Tytan Armyansk (2)
1977    FC Tytan Armyansk (3)
1978    FC Tytan Armyansk (4)
1979    FC Tytan Armyansk (5)
1980    FC Tytan Armyansk (6)
1981    FC Tytan Armyansk (7)
1982    FC Metalist Sevastopol (3)
1983    FC Avanhard Dzhankoy
1984    FC Avanhard Dzhankoy (2)
1985    FC Tytan Armyansk (8)
1986    FC Tytan Armyansk (9)
1987    FC Avanhard Dzhankoy (2)
1988    FC Tytan Armyansk (10)
1989    FC Frunze Saky
1990    FC Tytan Armyansk (11)
1991    FC Syntez Armyansk
=independence of Ukraine=
1992    FC Surozh Sudak
1993/94 FC Frunzenets-2 Saky (2)
1994/95 FC Chornomorets Sevastopol
1995/96 FC Portovyk Kerch (7)
1996/97 FC Surozh Sudak (2)
1997/98 FC SVKh-Danika Simferopol
1998/99 FC SVKh-Danika Simferopol (2)
1999/00 FC SVKh-Danika Simferopol (3)
2000/01 FC Danika-SELMA Simferopol (4)
2001    FC Lider Saky
2002    FC Krymteplytsia Molodizhne
2003    Tavria-TNU Simferopol
2004    FC Khimik Krasnoperekopsk
2005    FC Feniks-Illichovets Kalinine
2006    FC Yevpatoriya-2500
2007    FC Spartak Molodizhne
2008    FC Spartak Molodizhne (2)
2009    FC Spartak Molodizhne (3)
2010    FC Khimik Krasnoperekopsk (2)
2011    FC Hvardiyets Hvardiyske
2012    FC Hvardiyets Hvardiyske (2)
2013    FC Hvardiyets Hvardiyske (3)
2014→   =Russian military occupation=

Open Cup (by Tavriya Simferopol, Kherson Oblast)

2017    FC Myr Hornostayivka
2018    FC Myr Hornostayivka
2019    FC Krystal Kherson
2020    FC Krystal Kherson
2021    SC Tavriya Simferopol

Russian administration

2014    FC Gvardeets Hvardiyske (formerly FC Hvardiyets Hvardiyske)
2015    FC SKChF Sevastopol (All-Crimean tournament)
In 2015 there was established the Crimean Premier League.
2015–16 FC TSK Simferopol (Premier League)
 FC Krymteplytsia Molodizhne (Open championship)
2016-17 FC Sevastopol (Premier League)
 FC Gvardeets Hvardiyske (Open championship)
2017-18 FC Yevpatoriya (Premier League)
 FC Artek Yalta (Open championship, refused promotion)
2018-19 FC Sevastopol (Premier League)
 FC Favorit-VD Kafa Feodosia (Open championship)

Note: In 1993–99 the championship was organized by fall-spring calendar. In 1999 the main competition was shifted back to the summer calendar. Therefore, there are two champions in 1999.

Top winners

Football Federation of Ukraine period
 11 - FC Tytan Armyansk
 5 - FC Metalurh (Portovyk) Kerch
 5 - FC Avanhard Simferopol
 4 - FC Metalist (Avanhard) Sevastopol
 4 - FC (SVKh)-Danika-SELMA Simferopol
 3 - 3 clubs (Avanhard Dzh., Spartak M., Hvardiyets)
 2 - 5 clubs
 1 - 14 clubs

Crimean Football Union period
 3 - FC Dynamo Simferopol
 3 - ODO Simferopol
 2 - 3 clubs (Molot, Metallurg, Gvardeets)
 1 - 5 clubs

Premier League
 2 - FC Sevastopol
 1 - FC TSK Simferopol
 1 - FC Yevpatoria

Professional clubs
 FC Sudostroitel Sevastopol, 1949
 SKCF Sevastopol (DOF), 1954-1955, 1957-1970
 SC Tavriya Simferopol (Avangard), 1958-2014 (since 2017 in Kherson), 2017-2021
 FC Okean Kerch (Metallurg, Avangard), 1963-1969, 1979-1995, 1996/97
 FC Chayka-VMS Sevastopol --> FC Sevastopol (Avangard, Atlantika), 1964-1967, 1971-2014
 FC Sevastopol-2, 2008/09, 2011-2013
 FC Tytan Armyansk, 1992-2014
 FC More Feodosia, 1992-1993
 FC Dynamo Saky (Frunzenets), 1992-1997
 FC Surozh Sudak, 1993/94
 FC Ihroservis Simferopol (Dynamo), 2001-2009
 FC Krymteplytsia Molodizhne, 2003-2013
 FC Khimik Krasnoperekopsk, 2005-2008
 FC Yalos Yalta, 2005/06
 FC Feniks-Illichovets Kalinine, 2006-2011
 FC Zhemchuzhyna Yalta, 2012/13

See also
 FFU Council of Regions

References

Football in the regions of Ukraine
Football
Football in Crimea